La Fare may refer to:

Places
 La Fare-en-Champsaur, a commune in the Hautes-Alpes department in southeastern France
 La Fare-les-Oliviers, a commune in the Bouches-du-Rhône department in southern France

People
 Anne Louis Henri de La Fare (1752–1829), French Roman Catholic cardinal and counter-revolutionary
Charles Auguste de la Fare conte of Laugères, baron of Balazu (1644–1712), French poet memorialist
Philippe Charles de La Fare, 4th marquis of Monclar, Conte of Laugères (1687–1752), Marshal of France